Philip Roche (1693–1723) was an Irish pirate active in the seas of northern Europe, best known for murdering the crews and captains of ships he and his men took over.

History

Roche was involved in insurance scams, insuring ships then intentionally wrecking them, occasionally using the alias John Eustace. In November 1721 Roche and three associates booked passage on a French vessel sailing to Nantes. Roche was charismatic and had knowledge of seafaring, and convinced the ship’s master to let him handle the vessel. At a signal they rose up, slaughtered the French crew, and threw the captain overboard. They debated where to sail next, including Newfoundland. Afraid of being discovered, they modified the ship’s appearance, altered the ship’s logbooks, and renamed it Mary before sailing to Rotterdam to sell its cargo.

While there they took more cargo on board along with a cargo master named Annesly. One night later they threw Annelsy overboard and stole the cargo. At a French port they heard rumors about their own exploits and quickly put to sea, sailing to Scotland where they quietly dispersed. Authorities seized the ship but Roche had run away.

Roche was eventually found in London and imprisoned in Newgate. Tried for piracy, he was found guilty and hanged in August 1723. The public was disappointed at the execution: Roche "was so ill at the time that he could not make any public declaration of his abhorrence of the crime for which he suffered."

See also

Admiralty court, the court in which Roche and his associates were tried.

References

18th-century pirates
Irish pirates
People executed for piracy
1693 births
1723 deaths
Irish mass murderers
Executed mass murderers